Jeka Asparido Saragih (born ) is an Indonesian mixed martial artist. He competes in the lightweight division of the Ultimate Fighting Championship, where he became the first person from Indonesia to qualify for the final of Road to the UFC, after defeating Ki Won Bin in the semifinal by knockout.

Background 
Jeka was born in Bah Pasunsang, Raya, Simalungun, North Sumatra. He is a descendant of the Batak Simalungun. Jeka began his martial arts career by starting wushu in 2013 and won the national championship in Yogyakarta and had the opportunity to represent North Sumatra in the title of National Sports Week.

Mixed martial arts career

Early career 
Despite his busy schedule at work, Jeka continued to hone his martial arts skills, until finally becoming an apprentice at Yakop Sutjipto's Batam Fighter Club (BFC) gym. Jeka received an offer from the owner of BFC to take part in the One Pride Championship , starting his career in the lightweight division.

In April 2017, Jeka won the One Pride Lightweight championship, after successfully defeating the reigning champion, Ngapdi Mulidy, by TKO in the first round. He would go on to defend his title 4 times, before eventually losing it in February 2020, when he was submitted in the 4th round by Angga Hans via rear naked choke. He would rebound with two straight victories,  before winning the Interim Lightweight Championship against Hatoropan Simbolon via second round TKO stoppage.

Road to UFC 
Saragih faced Pawan Maan Singh in the Quarter-Finals of the Lightweight tournament on June 9, 2022 in Road to UFC: Episode 2. He won the bout in the third round, knocking out Singh with a spinning back fist.

Saragih faced Ki Won Bin in the Semi-Finals of the Lightweight tournament on October 23, 2022 at Road to UFC: Episode 5. He won the bout in the first round, knocking out Bin.

In the finals of the tournament, Saragih faced Anshul Jubli on February 4, 2023 at UFC Fight Night: Lewis vs. Spivak. He lost the fight via technical knockout in the second round.

Personal life 
In 2017, Jeka Saragih won the championship for the One Pride MMA competition for the 70 kg class in 2017. In 2018, he was also asked to carry the torch Asian Games around North Sumatra.

Championships and accomplishments 
One Pride MMA
OPMMA Lightweight Championship (One time)
Four successful title defenses
Interim OPMMA Lightweight Championship (One time)

Mixed martial arts record 

|-
|Loss
|align=center|13–3
|Anshul Jubli
|TKO (punches and elbows)
|UFC Fight Night: Lewis vs. Spivak
|
|align=center|2
|align=center|3:44
|Las Vegas, Nevada, United States
|
|-
|Win
|align=center|13–2
|Bin Ki-won
|KO (punch)
|Road to UFC: Episode 5
|
|align=center|1
|align=center|2:41
|Abu Dhabi, United Arab Emirates
|
|-
|Win
|align=center|12–2
|Pawan Maan Singh
|KO (spinning backfist)
|Road to UFC: Episode 2
|
|align=center|3
|align=center|2:24
|Kallang, Singapore
|
|-
|Win
|align=center|11–2
|Hatoropan Simbolon
|TKO (punch)
|One Pride MMA Fight Night 58
|
|align=center|2
|align=center|1:04
|Jakarta, Indonesia
|
|-
|Win
|align=center|10–2
|Rama Sabturi
|Decision (unanimous)
|One Pride MMA Fight Night 56
|
|align=center|3
|align=center|5:00
|Jakarta, Indonesia
|
|-
|Win
|align=center|9–2
|Agung Maulana
|TKO (punches and elbows)
|One Pride MMA Fight Night 40
|
|align=center|1
|align=center|2:55
|Jakarta, Indonesia
|
|-
|Loss
|align=center|8–2
|Angga Hans
|Submission (rear-naked choke)
|ONE Pride MMA Fight Night 36
|
|align=center|4
|align=center|4:23
|Jakarta, Indonesia
|
|-
|Win
|align=center|8–1
|Mhar John Manahan
|Submission (rear-naked choke)
|ONE Pride MMA Fight Night 32
|
|align=center|1
|align=center|3:12
|Jakarta, Indonesia
|
|-
|Win
|align=center|7–1
|Hendrik Tarigan
|Submission (rear-naked choke)
|One Pride MMA Fight Night 30
|
|align=center|1
|align=center|1:11
|Senayan, Indonesia
|
|-
|Win
|align=center|6–1
|Hatoropan Simbolon
|TKO (submission to elbows)
|One Pride MMA Fight Night 25
|
|align=center|2
|align=center|4:17
|Kelapa Gading, Indonesia
|
|-
|Win
|align=center|5–1
|Mohammad Fuad
|TKO (leg kicks)
|ONE Pride MMA Fight Night 19
|
|align=center|1
|align=center|4:01
|Kelapa Gading, Indonesia
|
|-
|Win
|align=center|4–1
|Kevin Sulistio
|Submission (rear-naked choke)
|ONE Pride MMA Fight Night 13
|
|align=center|3
|align=center|3:07
|Kelapa Gading, Indonesia
|
|-
|Win
|align=center|3–1
|Ngabdi Mulyadi
|TKO (punches)
|One Pride MMA Fight Night 9
|
|align=center|1
|align=center|2:40
|Kelapa Gading, Indonesia
|
|-
|Win
|align=center|2–1
|Victor Johanis
|TKO (elbows and punches)
|One Pride MMA Fight Night 6
|
|align=center|2
|align=center|1:45
|Kelapa Gading, Indonesia
|
|-
|Win
|align=center|1–1
|Rizki Muyla
|Submission (keylock)
|ONE Pride MMA Fight Night 5
|
|align=center|1
|align=center|1:25
|Jakarta, Indonesia
|
|-
|Loss
|align=center|0–1
|Kevin Sulistio
|Submission (kimura)
|ONE Pride MMA Fight Night 4
|
|align=center|1
|align=center|2:06
|Kelapa Gading, Indonesia
|
|-

See also 
 List of current UFC fighters
 List of male mixed martial artists

References

1995 births
Living people
Indonesian male mixed martial artists
Lightweight mixed martial artists
Mixed martial artists utilizing wushu
Indonesian wushu practitioners
Sportspeople from North Sumatra
Indonesian Christians
People of Batak descent